Eliad Nachum (born January 31, 1990), known professionally by his first name Eliad is an Israeli singer, songwriter and television actor.

Biography 
Eliad Nachum was born in Bat Yam, to Israeli parents of Sephardic Jewish (Iraqi-Jewish and Turkish-Jewish) descent. He studied in the Orat Ramat Yossef junior high school, and in the music class of the Ramot high school in Bat Yam. In 2008 he enlisted in the IDF and served as a singer in the band of Education and Youth Corps. Parallel to his service, he worked on a debut album with the record producers TripL.

Acting career 

In 1997 Eliad started to participate in the successful series "Shemesh" as Bar.

In 1998 he acted in the movie Ben-Gurion and dubbed on Popeye and Son.

In 2004 he acted a guest role on "HaPijamot". In 2009 he dubbed Jazz in "Joniur Baktana" and in 2011 he acted in "Alifim".

Music career

In 2011 he released with TripL band his first single, "Moving", from their debut album "Ready, Set, Pop". the single included on the international collection "Boiling Music".

In 2014 he released as singles the songs "Miklat", "Hofshi" and "Siman", that written by Nachum with the Israeli rapper Ron Nesher, the songs included on his debut album "Siman".

In 2015 he released the single "Matok Kshemarly", a song from his debut album "Siman". the song was one of the prominent and successful songs at the same year. the song reached the first place on the weekly chart of Media Forest and stayed 5 weeks in the first place on the weekly chart of Galgalatz.

On September 10, 2016 he elected for the Breakout of The Year and Song of The Year with the song "Matok Kshemarly" at the yearly chart of Galgalatz of 5775 AM.

Discography 

 2013: Ready, Set, Pop (with TripL)
 2015: Siman
 2016: Or
 2018: Tamid Chalamti

References 

1990 births
Living people
21st-century Israeli male singers
Israeli rock singers
Israeli pop singers
Israeli dancers
Israeli composers
Israeli male child actors
Israeli record producers
Israeli people of Iraqi-Jewish descent
Israeli people of Turkish-Jewish descent
People from Bat Yam